Gustav Heinrich Ernst Friedrich von Ingenohl (30 June 1857 – 19 December 1933) was a German admiral from Neuwied best known for his command of the German High Seas Fleet at the beginning of World War I.

He was the son of a tradesman.  He joined the navy in about 1874, and spent many years in the Far East.  He took part in an engagement in the First Sino-Japanese War in 1895.  He moved to the Admiralty in Berlin in 1897, and in 1904 became the commander of the yacht Hohenzollern. He became an admiral in 1908 and received the "von", which signified nobility, on 27 January 1909.  He became commander-in-chief of the navy in January 1913.

His intention of engaging the British Royal Navy in a quick, decisive battle was not supported by the German admiralty. Ingenohl repeatedly sought small engagements against the British fleet in order to provoke imprudent counterstrokes, in order to gain a crucial advantage for the German navy. The intended result did not materialize; in the first combat of this kind on 28 August 1914 at the Battle of Heligoland Bight, the German Imperial Navy (Kaiserliche Marine) lost three light cruisers and a torpedo boat to Royal Navy ships. After a similarly unsuccessful action on the Dogger Bank on 24 January 1915, Ingenohl yielded command of the High Seas Fleet on 2 February and was succeeded by Admiral Hugo von Pohl.

After the war, the Allies requested his extradition as a "war culprit", but Germany refused to comply.  Ingenohl died in Berlin on 19 December 1933.

Medals and awards 
 Iron Cross 1st and 2nd classes
 Order of the Red Eagle 3rd class with crown
 House Order of Hohenzollern
 Order of the Red Eagle 4th class with bow 
 Order of the White Falcon

References

 Sauerbrei, Wolfram (1999). Ingenohl : vier Sterne auf blauem Grund ; eine Neuwieder Familie, ein Admiral und mehr ... (in German). Neuwied : Kehrein. .
 http://s400910952.websitehome.co.uk/germancolonialuniforms/militaria/medals%20prussian.htm

1857 births
1933 deaths
People from Neuwied
Imperial German Navy admirals of World War I
People from the Rhine Province
Recipients of the Iron Cross (1914), 1st class
Grand Crosses of the Military Merit Order (Bavaria)
Admirals of the Imperial German Navy
Military personnel from Rhineland-Palatinate